The 2018 Khakas head election took place on 9 September 2018 in the Russian republic of Khakassia, after which opposition candidate Valentin Konovalov emerged victorious, although failing to reach the 50% threshold. The runoff was held on 11 November, which he also won.

For the first time in Russia since 1997, other candidates did not participate in the runoff, leading to a rarely used “in favour” and “against” choice.

First round campaign
At the 9 September 2018 proceedings, Communist candidate Valentin Konovalov received 44% of the vote, and the incumbent Head of Republic Viktor Zimin, nominated by the United Russia, received 32% of the vote. On 21 September Viktor Zimin withdrew his candidacy. The election process dictated that law the third placed candidate, Andrey Filyagin, nominated by A Just Russia, should be included but he also withdrew his candidacy on 2 October. Alexander Myakhar, from the Party of Growth, refused to participate in the election. The withdrawals were described as part of a coordinated effort by the political establishment to prevent Konovalov from winning, as it was considered easier to defeat him with “in favour” and “against” options rather than via a choice between him and another candidate. Konovalov now needed over 50% of the valid votes being cast “in favour” to win. An “against” result would lead to a new election.

On 3 October 2018, upon the expiration of Zimin’s term, Russian President Vladimir Putin appointed Mikhail Razvozhayev as the acting Head of the Republic to serve until the second round could be conducted.

Second Round campaign

Former deputy of the Supreme Council of Khakassia, Viktor Lebedev, led the anti-Konovalov forces, named ‘People's Head of Khakassia’. He called for a vote against Konovalov that would result in new elections. He was supported by the Mayor Nikolay Bulakin of Abakan, Mayor of Mikhail Valov of Sayanogorsk and rapper Denis Shulga. In the event of victory, it was hoped that the Putin-appointed interim Head Razvozhayev would take part. 

Konovalov’s headquarters successfully fought off the challenge, and Konovalov was elected Head with 57.6% of the vote “in favour”.

Candidates
Four candidates were registered to participate in the election

Results

References

Khakassia
September 2018 events in Russia
Politics of Khakassia